Dame Jane Clare Moulder is a British former High Court judge.

Moulder attended Cheltenham Ladies' College and Aylesbury High School. She studied law at Clare College, Cambridge. In 1984, she was admitted as a solicitor. She joined Linklaters in 1982, specialising in capital markets, and was made partner in 1991.

In 2010, she was appointed a recorder and a deputy High Court judge in 2013. In 2015, she was appointed a specialist mercantile circuit judge.

On 2 October 2017, she was appointed a judge of the High Court and assigned to the King's Bench Division; she sat in the Commercial Court. She received the customary damehood in the same year. On 26 October 2022, she retired from the High Court.

References 

Living people
21st-century English judges
Dames Commander of the Order of the British Empire
Alumni of Clare College, Cambridge
English solicitors
Year of birth missing (living people)